The 2021 Ladies European Tour was a series of golf tournaments for elite female golfers from around the world. The tournaments were sanctioned by the Ladies European Tour (LET).

The season was affected by the COVID-19 pandemic with many tournaments either being postponed or cancelled. Among the cancellations was the Australian Swing, the tour's season opening.

Schedule
The table below shows the 2021 schedule. The season featured a month-long European Swing of the LPGA Tour, starting with the Evian Championship in late July. It also saw the introduction of the Aramco Team Series, four tournaments carrying a $1 million total prize fund each held in London, Sotogrande and New York, concluding in Saudi Arabia in November. 

The numbers in brackets after the winners' names indicate the career wins on the Ladies European Tour, including that event, and is only shown for members of the tour.

Key

Unofficial events
The following event appears on the schedule, but does not carry ranking points.

Order of Merit rankings

Source:

See also
2021 LPGA Tour

References

External links
Official site of the Ladies European Tour
2021 Ladies European Tour Tournaments

2021
2021 in women's golf
2021 in European sport
Sports events curtailed due to the COVID-19 pandemic